The Master and Margarita (Мастер и Маргарита) is a Russian film made by director Yuri Kara, based on the novel The Master and Margarita by the Russian author Mikhail Bulgakov.

Background
Although the film was made in 1994, it was not released until April 4, 2011, and played only in Russia. Despite its large budget and a well-known cast, the producers decided not to release it because they found the director's cut to be unacceptable. The soundtrack, recorded by Alfred Schnittke, was released on CD.

When journalist Valeriy Kitshin of the Rossiyskaya Gazeta saw the film in a private screening at the Moscow International Film Festival in 2005, he tried to convince the producers to release it. However, Sergey Shilovsky, the grandson of Mikhail Bulgakov's third wife Elena Sergeevna, claimed to have the copyright on Bulgakov's literary inheritance, and asked for payment. Shilovsky eventually sold the rights to producer Scott Steindorff of Stone Village Productions, who commissioned Caroline Thompson to write the script.

On November 15, 2010, the Russian film distributor Luxor announced that they had bought the rights to the film. It was on April 4, 2011. Luxor shortened the film to 118 minutes from the original director's cut, which was 240 minutes long. Copies are available on bootleg disks of low image quality.

Plot
The film is an adaptation of the novel The Master and Margarita by Russian author Mikhail Bulgakov. Three storylines are interwoven. The first is a satire of the 1930s, the period during which Joseph Stalin is in power in the Soviet Union. The devil Woland comes to Moscow to have his annual spring ball of the full moon. He and his companions  challenge corrupt bureaucrats and profiteers. The second story, set in Jerusalem, describes the inner struggle of Pontius Pilate before, during, and after the conviction and execution of  Jesus. The third part tells the love story between a nameless writer in Moscow in the 1930s and his lover, Margarita. He has written a novel on Pontius Pilate, a subject which was taboo in the officially anti-religious atheistic Soviet Union.

Soundtrack
The "bolero" in the soundtrack references Maurice Ravel's Bolero.

Cast
 Margarita: Anastasiya Vertinskaya
 The Master: Viktor Rakov
 Woland: Valentin Gaft
 Ivan Bezdomny: Sergey Garmash
 Pontius Pilate: Mikhail Ulyanov
 Korovyev: Aleksandr Filippenko
 Behemoth: Viktor Pavlov
 Yeshua Ha-Nozri: Nikolai Burlyayev
 Kaifa: Vyacheslav Shalevich
 Azazello: Vladimir Steklov

Soundtrack
 Meister und Margarita I - 1:47
 Voland - 2:26
 Foxtrot - 1:04
 Tango - 0:59
 Marche Funebre - 1:12
 Boléro (Maurice Ravel) - 15:00
 Meister und Margarita II - 1:50

All tracks composed by Alfred Schnittke, except the Boléro.

References

External links
 
 Master i Margarita (Yuri Kara) on the Master & Margarita website

1994 films
Films scored by Alfred Schnittke
Films based on The Master and Margarita
Russian fantasy films
Portrayals of Jesus in film
Cultural depictions of Judas Iscariot
Cultural depictions of Pontius Pilate
Caiaphas